The 1948 Irish general election to the 13th Dáil was held on Wednesday, 4 February following the dissolution of the 12th Dáil on 12 January 1948 by the President Seán T. O'Kelly on the request of Taoiseach Éamon de Valera. The general election took place in 40 constituencies throughout Ireland for 147 seats in Dáil Éireann, the house of representatives of the Oireachtas, with a revision of Dáil constituencies under the Electoral (Amendment) Act 1947, which had increased the number of seats by 9 since the previous election. The election resulted in Fianna Fáil leaving government for the first time in 16 years and the formation of the first coalition government in Ireland.

The constituency of Carlow–Kilkenny voted on 8 February after the death during the campaign of Fine Gael candidate Eamonn Coogan TD. Another Fine Gael deputy in the same constituency, James Hughes, had died shortly before the dissolution.

The 13th Dáil met at Leinster House on 18 February to nominate the Taoiseach for appointment by the president and to approve the appointment of a new government of Ireland on the nomination of the Taoiseach. John A. Costello was appointed leading the First Inter-Party Government, a five-party minority coalition.

This election was the last one before Ireland's withdrawal from the British Commonwealth and the declaration of the Republic of Ireland, which came into effect on 18 April 1949 under The Republic of Ireland Act 1948.

Campaign
 
The general election of 1948 was caused by a desire by the Taoiseach Éamon de Valera, to stop the rise of a new party, Clann na Poblachta. In 1947 the rapid rise of Clann na Poblachta threatened the position of Fianna Fáil. The government of Éamon de Valera introduced the Electoral (Amendment) Act 1947 which increased the size of the Dáil from 138 to 147 and increased the number of three-seat constituencies from fifteen to twenty-two. The result was described by historian Tim Pat Coogan as "a blatant attempt at gerrymander which no Six County Unionist could have bettered."

A number of other issues were raised on the campaign that the parties had not foreseen. Fianna Fáil had enjoyed an uninterrupted sixteen years of dominance in government. Many people believed that the party had become stale and there was a strong desire for a fresh change. Although World War II had ended three years earlier, rationing continued, and massive inflation plagued the economy. A prolonged teachers strike during the lifetime of the previous Dáil damaged the government due to its inability to settle the dispute. Bad weather added to the woes of the farmers, and poor harvests resulted in anger at the ballot box. Allegations that Éamon de Valera and Seán Lemass were involved in bribery and corruption raised questions about certain public officials.

Despite these issues, Fianna Fáil still expected to retain power. This prospect seemed very likely; however, an unlikely coalition was soon to be formed.

Result

|}

Fianna Fáil dropped 8 seats but remained the largest party. Clann na Poblachta secured ten seats instead of the nineteen they would have received proportional to their vote. The other parties remained roughly the same, with Fine Gael only gaining an extra seat.

Voting summary

Seats summary

Government formation

The election left de Valera six seats short of a majority in the 147-seat Dáil. Fianna Fáil had long refused to enter a formal coalition with another party, instead preferring confidence and supply agreements with other parties when it was short of an outright majority.  This time, however, de Valera was unable to reach an agreement with National Labour and the Independents with a view to forming a government.

It seemed unlikely that the other political parties could unite to oust Fianna Fáil. Between them, they only had one seat fewer than Fianna Fáil. If they could get the support of at least seven independents, they would be able to form a government. On paper, such a motley coalition appeared politically unrealistic. However, a shared dislike of Fianna Fáil and de Valera overcame all other difficulties to knock Fianna Fáil from power for the first time in 16 years.

As the largest party in the coalition, it was a foregone conclusion that Fine Gael would provide the nominee for Taoiseach. The natural choice was the party leader, Richard Mulcahy. However, republicans such as Seán MacBride refused to serve under the man who had been the commander of the Free State forces during the civil war.  Since the other parties would have been 17 seats short of a majority (and indeed, would have been 11 seats behind Fianna Fáil) without MacBride, Mulcahy stepped aside in favour of John A. Costello, a relatively unknown politician and former Attorney General. Mulcahy, who remained leader of Fine Gael, became Minister for Education. William Norton, the leader of the Labour Party became Tánaiste and Minister for Social Welfare.

On paper, this new coalition government looked weak and seemed unlikely to last. It consisted of a patchwork collection of political parties. There were young and old politicians, republicans and Free Staters, conservatives and socialists. The government's survival depended on a united dislike of Fianna Fáil, the skill of Costello as Taoiseach and the independence of various ministers.

The coalition lasted over three years from February 1948 to May 1951.

First time TDs

Noël Browne
James Collins
Seán Collins
Patrick Crotty
Michael Davern
Dan Desmond
Seán Dunne
Mick Fitzpatrick
Joseph Hughes
Seán Keane
Michael F. Kitt
Robert Lahiffe
Con Lehane
Patrick Lehane
Jack Lynch
Patrick McGrath
Jack McQuillan
Patrick Maguire
Patrick O'Gorman
Michael O'Higgins
Tom O'Higgins
John Ormonde
Joseph Roddy
Éamon Rooney
Michael Sheehan
Gerard Sweetman
John Tully
Thomas Walsh

Re-elected TDs
John Esmonde
James Hickey

Outgoing TDs
William Broderick (Retired)
Eamonn Coogan (Deceased)
Frank Daly (Retired)
Andrew Fogarty (Lost seat)
Walter Furlong (Lost seat)
James Hughes (Deceased)
Frank Loughman (Lost seat)
Peter O'Loghlen (Retired)
John S. O'Connor (Lost seat)
Patrick Shanahan (Lost seat)
Leo Skinner (Lost seat)
Laurence Walsh (Lost seat)

Notes

References

1948 elections in Europe
General election, 1948
1948
Ireland and the Commonwealth of Nations
13th Dáil
February 1948 events in Europe
General election